The Blytheville Commercial Historic District encompasses most of the central business district of Blytheville, Arkansas, one of the TWO JUDICIAL DISTRICTS of Mississippi County.  It extends along Main Street between 5th and Franklin Streets, and along Ash Street between 5th and 2nd.  Most of the 39 buildings in the district were built between 1890 and 1956, in three phases of development.  The two oldest buildings in the district, both dating to c. 1890, are at 112 West Main and 106 East Main.  The building traditionally viewed as the anchor of the downtown area is the Kirby-Heath building at the corner of Main and 2nd, built 1901.

The district was listed on the National Register of Historic Places in 2006.  The Kress Building at 210 Main Street, separately listed in 1997, is also within the district.

See also
National Register of Historic Places listings in Mississippi County, Arkansas

References

Buildings and structures completed in 1890
Historic districts on the National Register of Historic Places in Arkansas
National Register of Historic Places in Mississippi County, Arkansas
Blytheville, Arkansas
Commercial buildings on the National Register of Historic Places in Arkansas
Modern Movement architecture in the United States
Late 19th and Early 20th Century American Movements architecture